24th Ruler was an ajaw of the Maya city of Tikal. He ruled in around the year 645. Information about this ajaw and his predecessor 23rd Ruler are scarce. K'inich Muwaan Jol II is estimated to be the best candidate for the 23rd or 24th Ruler as might have been the father of 25th ajaw Nuun Ujol Chaak.

Footnotes

References

Year of death unknown
Rulers of Tikal
7th century in the Maya civilization
7th-century monarchs in North America
Year of birth unknown